Gosho Motoharu (1919 – October 27, 2012) was a prominent Japanese master of the martial arts, koryu budō or kobudō.
 		 
The Shihan (master), of the schools Niten Ichi Ryu (created by the famous rōnin Miyamoto Musashi) and Sekiguchi Ryu, Gosho Motoharu was awarded the rank of Menkyo kaiden, in both schools. He was also an iaido Hachidan (8th Dan) and kendo Nanadan (7th Dan). 	

Gosho Motoharu was a close disciple of the 8th Soke (headmaster) of the Niten Ichi Ryu and 14th Soke of Sekiguchi Ryu, master Aoki Kikuo. He was chosen by Aoki to be shihan and adjunct successor of both schools to ensure the teachings of the ryus to the future generations.

He was the headmaster of the Gosho-ha Hyoho Niten Ichi ryu, which was the only branch of the ryu to keep the teachings as they arrived the 20th century with Aoki. In 2007, his son, Yoshimochi Kiyoshi, succeeded Kiyonaga Fumiya, as 11th successor, at the request of the Kiyonaga family, and become the 12th successor (daijunidai seito shihan) of Hyoho Niten Ichi Ryu, reuniting the Gosho Ha and Seito (main) lineages.

Biography
1919 — Born in Oita-ken, Usa-shi 	  		 
1929 — Start learning budo.
1961 — Receive the title of Shihan and Adjunct successor of the Kobudo schools Niten Ichi Ryu and Sekiguchi Ryu by their headmaster, Aoki Kikuo. 	 
1966 — Receive the grade of Kendo Kyoshi Nanadan (7th Dan)
1981 — Represents the Niten Ichi Ryu in the official archive of the Nihon Budokan. 	 
1983 — Represents the Niten Ichi Ryu in Paris, in a demonstration broadcast by the NHK network in all Japan. In the same occasion gave classes on Niten Ichi Ryu to the French Police (by Nihon Budokan).  
1986 — Represents the Niten Ichi Ryu in Beijing and Shanghai (by Nihon Budokan).  
1988 — Represents the Niten Ichi Ryu in Australia in the commemoration of the national 200 years anniversary (by Nihon Budokan).  
1989 — Receive the title of Iaido Hanshi Hachidan.
2004 — Requested by other masters of the Niten Ichi Ryu, founds the Gosho-ha Hyoho Niten Ichi ryu, to preserve the original teachings of the school.
2006 — Writes the presentation of the Brazilian edition of Miyamoto Musashi's Book of Five Rings (Gorin No Sho)
2007 — By request of the Ōita Kendo Association, the main lineage of the school is reestablished at Usa. His son, Kiyoshi Yoshimoti becomes the 12th successor of Niten Ichi Ryu.
2012 — Died in October 27, 2012 at Ōita, Japan, at the age of 93 years.
Shihan Gosho transmitted the original teachings of Hyoho Niten Ichi Ryu to the masters Kiyoshi Yoshimoti, Ishii Toyozumi, Shigematsu Isao, and Jorge Kishikawa.

References

External links
 Shihan Gosho Motoharu (pictures)
 Official site of Gosho Ha Hyoho Niten Ichi Ryu

1919 births
2012 deaths
Japanese kobudoka
People from Ōita Prefecture